The 1987–88 Courage League National Division One was the first season of the first tier of the English rugby union league system. It was the first season of a truly national rugby union league, which is currently known as the Gallagher Premiership. 

There was no fixture list; the teams arranged fixtures amongst themselves. One match would count between each of the twelve teams involved and the points scheme was such that a team received four points for a win, two for a draw and one point for a loss. Most teams played eleven games, although some played ten.

Leicester Tigers finished first in the league table and were crowned champions. Coventry and Sale were relegated to the 1988–89 Courage League National Division Two for next season, the latter side having lost all of its eleven matches. Rosslyn Park and Liverpool St Helens were promoted from the 1987–88 Courage League National Division Two for the following season.

Participating teams

League table

Results

The home team is listed in the left column.

First match

Sponsorship
National Division One is part of the Courage Clubs Championship and is sponsored by Courage Brewery

See also
 English rugby union system

References

Premiership Rugby seasons
 
English